Henry may refer to:

People
Henry (given name)
Henry (surname)
 Henry Lau, Canadian singer and musician who performs under the mononym Henry

Royalty

 Portuguese royalty
 King-Cardinal Henry, King of Portugal
 Henry, Count of Portugal,  Henry of Burgundy, Count of Portugal (father of Portugal's first king)
 Prince Henry the Navigator, Infante of Portugal
 Infante Henrique, Duke of Coimbra (born 1949), the sixth in line to Portuguese throne 
 King of Germany
Henry the Fowler (876–936), first king of Germany
 King of Scots (in name, at least)
 Henry Stuart, Lord Darnley (1545/6–1567), consort of Mary, queen of Scots
 Henry Benedict Stuart, the 'Cardinal Duke of York', brother of Bonnie Prince Charlie, who was hailed by Jacobites as Henry IX
 Four kings of Castile:
Henry I of Castile
Henry II of Castile
Henry III of Castile
Henry IV of Castile
 Five kings of France, spelt Henri in Modern French since the Renaissance to italianize the name and to make the difference with the Norman and the English Henry.
Henry I of France 
Henry II of France
Henry III of France
Henry IV of France
Henri, comte de Chambord, Henry V of France
 Six Holy Roman Emperors:
Henry II, Holy Roman Emperor
Henry III, Holy Roman Emperor
Henry IV, Holy Roman Emperor
Henry V, Holy Roman Emperor
Henry VI, Holy Roman Emperor
Henry VII, Holy Roman Emperor
 Eight Kings of England:
Henry I of England
Henry II of England
Henry the Young King, co-ruler with his father, Henry II, until his death.
Henry III of England
Henry IV of England
Henry V of England
Henry VI of England
Henry VII of England
Henry VIII of England
 Counts of Waldeck
Henry III, Lord of Waldeck
Henry IV, Count of Waldeck
Henry VI, Count of Waldeck
Henry VII, Count of Waldeck
Henry VIII, Count of Waldeck
Henry IX, Count of Waldeck
Henry Wolrad, Count of Waldeck
 Prince Harry (formally Prince Henry, Duke of Sussex), son of King Charles III and grandson of Queen Elizabeth II of England
 Henry of Prussia (disambiguation), multiple people
 Henri, Grand Duke of Luxembourg
 Henrik, Prince Consort of Denmark, né Henri Marie Jean André de Laborde de Monpezat
 Prince Henry, Duke of Gloucester
 Prince Henry of Battenberg
 Henry (Obotrite prince) (died 1127), "King of the Slavs"

Places

Extraterrestrial
 Henry (Apollo lunar crater), smaller than the above, visited by astronauts during Apollo 17 mission
 Henry (lunar crater)
 Henry (Martian crater)

Terrestrial
 Henry Bay, Antarctica
 Henry County (disambiguation)
 Henry Creek, a stream in Kansas
 Henry, Illinois, a city
 Henry, Indiana, an unincorporated community
 Henry, Nebraska, a village
 Henry, South Dakota, a town
 Henry Lake (disambiguation)
 Henry Township (disambiguation)
 Henry River (disambiguation)
 Lake Henry (disambiguation)

Arts, entertainment, and media
 Henry (2015 film), a virtual reality film
 Henry (2011 film), a short film by Yan England
 Henry: Portrait of a Serial Killer, a horror movie
 Henry (comics), an American comic strip created in 1932 by Carl Anderson
 "Henry", a song by New Riders of the Purple Sage
 Henry, a character in The Walking Dead TV series
 Henry the Green Engine, a character from Thomas the Tank Engine and Friends

Firearms
 Henry rifle, the first "practical" repeating rifle
 Henry Repeating Arms, a firearms manufacturing company established in 1996

Ships
 HMS Henry (1656), English Royal Navy vessel
 Henry (1819 ship) wrecked in 1825
 Henry (1826 ship) lost in 1841
 SS Henry, a Norwegian merchant ship sunk in controversial circumstances in 1944

Other uses
 Henry (unit), the SI unit of inductance
 Henry's law, which describes the distribution of a chemical between the gas and the liquid phase
 Henry (vacuum), flagship vacuum cleaner manufactured by Numatic International Limited
 Henry the Hexapus, a six-legged octopus found by British marine scientists in 2008

See also 
 Henry's (disambiguation)
 Justice Henry (disambiguation)
 
 Henrik